The Thief of Bagdad may refer to:

A number of films and the novelisation of the 1924 film by one of the screenwriters:
 The Thief of Bagdad (1924 film), starring Douglas Fairbanks
 The Thief of Bagdad (novel), a 1924 novelisation by Achmed Abdullah of the film starring Douglas Fairbanks, derived from elements of One Thousand and One Nights fables, and his own screenplay.
 The Thief of Bagdad (1940 film), featuring Sabu and Conrad Veidt
 The Thief of Bagdad (1952 film), a German remake of the 1940 film
 The Thief of Bagdad (1961 film), a film starring Steve Reeves
 Thief of Baghdad (1969 film), a Shriram Bohra 1969 Hindi film, starring Dara Singh, Nishi, Helen
 Thief of Baghdad (1977 film), a Ravikant Nagaich 1977 Indian film, starring Shatrughan Sinha, Kabir Bedi, Bindu, Prem Chopra, Prem Nath and Mehmood Ali
 The Thief of Baghdad (1978 film), a motion picture starring Kabir Bedi and Roddy McDowall

Other uses:
Baghdad Ka Chor, or The Thief of Baghdad, a 1946 Indian film by Nanubhai Vakil
Video title of La Rosa di Bagdad, a 1949 animated film based on the fables
Baghdad Thirudan, or The Thief of Baghdad, a 1960 Indian film by T. P. Sundaram
Ajooba, a 1980 Indian-Soviet film that was released as The Return of the Thief of Baghdad in the Soviet Union
The Thief of Baghdad (board game), which was nominated for a 2007 Spiel des Jahres award
"The Thief of Baghdad", a track from Kilimanjaro by The Teardrop Explodes

See also
 "The Thief of Baghead", an episode of the animated sitcom Futurama
 The Adventures of Prince Achmed, a 1926 animated film with a similar story, but possibly independently conceived.